Those Two (Italian: Quei due) is a 1935 Italian comedy film directed by Gennaro Righelli and starring Eduardo De Filippo, Peppino De Filippo and Assia Noris. A couple of men struggling to find work both fall in love with the same woman. The story is loosely based on two works by Eduardo De Filippo.

Cast
 Eduardo De Filippo as Il professore 
 Peppino De Filippo as Giacomino 
 Assia Noris as Lily 
 Maurizio D'Ancora as Mario 
 Lamberto Picasso as Gerbi 
 Luigi Almirante as Gelsomino 
 Franco Coop as Giovanni 
 Anna Magnani as Pierotta 
 Giuseppe Pierozzi as Un matto della clinica 'Villa Belvedere'

References

Bibliography 
 Moliterno, Gino. Historical Dictionary of Italian Cinema. Scarecrow Press, 2008.

External links 

1935 films
Italian comedy films
1935 comedy films
1930s Italian-language films
Films based on works by Eduardo De Filippo
Films directed by Gennaro Righelli
Italian black-and-white films
1930s Italian films